Love of Blood Relations (혈육애 - Hyeolyukae) is a 1976 South Korean film directed by Kim Ki-young. When the South Korean government pressured Kim to make an anti-Communist film, he responded with this film. By focusing on a femme fatale from North Korea, Kim was able to transcend the propagandistic origins to make a characteristically personal work.

Plot
Based on a novel by Kim Won-dae, the film is an anti-Communist melodrama in which personal affairs affect international relations between North and South Korea and Japan.

Cast
Lee Hwa-si
Kim Won-seop
Choi Bool-am
Jeon Yang-ja
Hyeon Seok
Jo Jae-seong
Park Am
Park Gyu-chae
Joo Sun-tae
Han Eun-jin

Awards
The award for best art direction was given to Kim Seong-bae at the Grand Bell Awards.

References

Films directed by Kim Ki-young
1970s Korean-language films
South Korean drama films